The 2017 West Chester Golden Rams football team represented West Chester University in Division II football as a member of the PSAC East division.

Background

Previous season
In 2016 the Golden Rams finished with an 8–3 including an impressive 6–1 conference record, including a 6-game end of the year winning streak while averaging 33 points per games and holding opponents to under 14 point in each of their last six games.

Schedule

Spring game

Regular season

Rankings

References

West Chester
West Chester Golden Rams football seasons
West Chester Golden Rams football